Lostant is a village in LaSalle County, Illinois, United States. The population was 423 at the 2020 census, down from 498 at the 2010 census. It is part of the Ottawa Micropolitan Statistical Area.

History
A post office has been in operation at Lostant since 1861. The village was named for Lostant Mercier, the wife of French diplomat Henri Mercier. Horatio N. Boshell (1872–1933), Illinois state representative and physician, was born in Lostant.

Geography
Lostant is located in southwestern LaSalle County at  (41.142127, -89.061384). The village limits extend south to the Marshall County line.

Illinois Route 251 runs through the western side of the village, leading north  to Tonica and south  to Wenona. Illinois Route 18 passes through the southern extension of Lostant; it leads east  to Streator and west  to Henry. Interstate 39 runs along the southwestern edge of the village, with access from Exit 41 (IL 18). I-39 leads north  to LaSalle and south  to Normal.

Demographics

As of the 2020 census there were 423 people, 184 households, and 114 families residing in the village. The racial makeup of the village was 95.04% White, 0.24% Native American, 0.47% Asian, 0.24% Pacific Islander, 1.18% from other races, and 2.84% from two or more races. Hispanic or Latino of any race were 3.55% of the population.

There were 184 households, out of which 64.13% had children under the age of 18 living with them, 45.11% were married couples living together, 10.87% had a female householder with no husband present, and 38.04% were non-families. 22.83% of all households were made up of individuals, and 13.59% had someone living alone who was 65 years of age or older. The average household size was 3.09 and the average family size was 2.52.

The village's age distribution consisted of 25.7% under the age of 18, 11.7% from 18 to 24, 27.5% from 25 to 44, 20.1% from 45 to 64, and 15.1% who were 65 years of age or older. The median age was 34.4 years. For every 100 females, there were 117.4 males. For every 100 females age 18 and over, there were 106.0 males.

The median income for a household in the village was $64,643, and the median income for a family was $77,778. Males had a median income of $45,500 versus $30,313 for females. The per capita income for the village was $32,931. About 1.8% of families and 8.2% of the population were below the poverty line, including 7.6% of those under age 18 and 8.6% of those age 65 or over.

School
Lostant Elementary Grade School

References

Villages in Illinois
Ottawa, IL Micropolitan Statistical Area
Villages in LaSalle County, Illinois
Populated places established in 1861
1861 establishments in Illinois